This is a list of  Asian nominees and winners of Golden Globe Awards. This list is current as of the 80th Golden Globe Awards.

Film

Best Performance by an Actor in a Motion Picture – Drama

Best Performance by an Actress in a Motion Picture – Drama

Best Performance by an Actor in a Motion Picture – Musical or Comedy

Best Performance by an Actress in a Motion Picture – Musical or Comedy

Best Supporting Actor – Motion Picture

Best Supporting Actress – Motion Picture

Television

Best Television Series – Drama

Best Actor in a Television Series – Drama

Best Actress in a Television Series – Drama

Best Actor in a Television Series – Comedy or Musical

Best Actress in a Television Series – Comedy or Musical

Best Supporting Actor – Series, Miniseries or Motion Picture Made for Television

Best Supporting Actress – Series, Miniseries or Motion Picture Made for Television

Acting Category

Film

Men

Women

Television

Men

Women

Directing Category

References

 Asian winners
Lists of award winners
Golden Globe winners